Par Surakh (also Romanized as Par Sūrākh; also known as Parreh Sīlā and Parreh Sūrākh) is a village in Qaleh Tall Rural District, in the Central District of Bagh-e Malek County, Khuzestan Province, Iran. At the 2006 census, its population was 86, in 17 families.

References 

Populated places in Bagh-e Malek County